Hersheypark Arena (originally Hershey Sports Arena) is a multi-purpose indoor arena located in Hershey, Pennsylvania, managed by Hershey Entertainment & Resorts Company. The arena has a seating capacity, for hockey, of 7,286 people and in excess of 8,000, including standing room.

History 

When built in 1936 as the Hershey Sports Arena, the building was the largest monolithic structure in the United States in which not a single seat suffered from an obstructed view. For 64 years it was the home of the Hershey Bears hockey team from 1938 to 2002. The second sport at the arena was basketball. It hosted the PIAA basketball and wrestling championships, and it also served as the home of the Hershey Impact, a National Professional Soccer League team from 1988 to 1991. It has also hosted the Ice Capades, Disney on Ice, professional boxing, tennis competitions, and the World Wrestling Federation's (WWF) In Your House 5 pay-per-view in 1995. Previously it hosted WWF's Saturday Night's Main Event III on October 31, 1985 (aired November 2) with the main event being a tag-team match featuring WWF Champion Hulk Hogan teaming with André the Giant facing the team of Big John Studd and King Kong Bundy.

On October 13, 1953, the arena also hosted an extravagant birthday celebration for President Dwight D. Eisenhower whose farm and "weekend White House" was located in nearby Gettysburg. Phish performed and recorded their show, on December 1, 1995, which was later released as a live album, entitled Live Phish 12.01.95.

On September 22, 2012, the arena played host to its only wedding. It was held at center ice.

Basketball
On March 2, 1962, Philadelphia Warriors center Wilt Chamberlain recorded a record-setting 100 points in an NBA game against the New York Knicks, a record that still stands today.

Roof fire 
On July 5, 2012, a fire damaged the arena, which was in the midst of refurbishment. At about 3:00 PM local time, the fire was upgraded to five alarms. The fire burned for about two hours before being extinguished. The roof was damaged, but reported to not be in danger of collapse. The cause of the fire is still unknown.

Current use 
Hersheypark Arena is the home rink for the Lebanon Valley College ice hockey team. LVC competes in NCAA Division III as of 2016, and previously competed in the ACHA. In addition, the arena hosts the Hershey Junior Bears, a youth team sponsored by the Bears organization. On most weekends during the fall and winter months, the rink is open to the public for ice skating.

Annually, it hosts part of the Music in the Parks competition.

Notes and references

External links
 Hersheypark Arena official website
 Hershey Bears Hockey Club official website
 Lebanon Valley College Flying Dutchmen Ice Hockey
 Shippensburg University Raiders Ice Hockey 
 "1936-2002: HersheyPark Arena's Sixty-Six Years as Home to Hershey Bears Hockey"
 "The 1938-39 Philadelphia-Hershey Hockey Wars"

1936 establishments in Pennsylvania
Buildings and structures in Dauphin County, Pennsylvania
Hershey Bears
Hersheypark
Hershey Entertainment and Resorts Company
Indoor arenas in Pennsylvania
Indoor ice hockey venues in the United States
Indoor soccer venues in the United States
Sports venues completed in 1936
Sports venues in Pennsylvania
Tourist attractions in Dauphin County, Pennsylvania
Wrestling venues in Pennsylvania